Matthew George Guokas Sr. (November 11, 1915 – December 9, 1993) was an American professional basketball player and broadcaster. He was the son of Lithuanian immigrants.

A  forward from Saint Joseph's University, Guokas played one season with the Philadelphia Warriors of the BAA (a precursor to the NBA). He averaged 1.7 points during the Warriors' 1946–47 championship season. After losing his right leg in an automobile accident, Guokas turned to broadcasting, and he served as an announcer for the National Football League's Philadelphia Eagles from 1953 to 1985. He was also the public address announcer for Philadelphia Phillies baseball games at Connie Mack Stadium in 1965 to 1966, succeeding the late Pete Byron, and replaced by Eddie Ferenz. 

His son Matt Guokas Jr. played in the NBA from 1966 to 1976, and later coached the Philadelphia 76ers and Orlando Magic and worked as a broadcaster for the NBA on NBC and other sports networks.

Guokas and his son, Matt Jr., were the first father-son duo to both win NBA championships as players; this feat has since been repeated by the Barrys (Rick and Brent), the Waltons (Bill and Luke), the Thompsons (Mychal and Klay), and the Paytons (Gary and Gary II).

BAA career statistics

Regular season

Playoffs

References

External links

Obituary

1915 births
1993 deaths
All-American college men's basketball players
American men's basketball players
American people of Lithuanian descent
Basketball players from Philadelphia
National Football League announcers
Philadelphia Eagles announcers
Philadelphia Warriors players
Saint Joseph's Hawks men's basketball players
Shooting guards
Small forwards
Wilkes-Barre Barons players